John Bryson served as the 19th Mayor of Los Angeles from December 10, 1888, to February 25, 1889.  In that time, he appointed all 6 of his sons to the then 80-man Los Angeles Police Department. He would later serve as President of the San Gabriel Valley Rapid Transit Railroad.

Bryson, John
Year of death missing
Year of birth missing